SY Liberty was a steam yacht built in 1908 at Leith, Scotland, for Joseph Pulitzer and one of the largest private yachts of its day. She served as a Royal Navy hospital ship during World War I.

Description 
The steam yacht Liberty was designed by G L Watson & Co and launched by Ramage & Ferguson Ltd at Leith on 5 December 1907. She had twin screws, powered by two triple expansion steam engines made by the shipbuilder.

In addition to the expected high level of luxury, Liberty was especially fitted with ramps and soundproofing due to Pulitzer's blindness and extreme sensitivity to noise, and was nicknamed "The Tower of Silence".

History 
Liberty was built in 1908 at a cost of US$1.5 million for newspaper publisher Joseph Pulitzer, who died on board at Charleston, South Carolina on 29 October 1911.   She was sold to Scottish-Canadian businessman James Ross, renamed Glencairn and registered in Portsmouth, England. Ross sailed around the world in her in 1912, hoping to improve his health, but died the following year. In 1914 she was purchased by Viscount Tredegar, who reverted her name to the original Liberty.

In September 1915 she was requisitioned by the Royal Navy for the duration of World War I, initially as an auxiliary patrol yacht Liberty IV, though soon transformed at Lord Tredegar's expense to a hospital ship, No. 10, first operating within the North Sea and for much of the time under the command of her owner. She was returned to Lord Tredegar in January 1919.

After completion in December 1919 of a refit at Cowes as a yacht, Viscount Tredegar embarked on Liberty for a six-month cruise in the Mediterranean and Red Seas.  After further summer cruising, he sold her to the shipping magnate Sir Robert Houston in September 1920. Following his marriage in 1924, Houston moved his residence to Jersey for tax reasons and also re-registered his yacht there. Like Pulitzer, he died on board the yacht, on 14 April 1926. 
 
Left in his will to his wife Lucy, Lady Houston, she lived aboard Liberty much of the time.  
In the 1930s, to express her hatred for former prime minister Ramsay MacDonald, she hung a huge electric sign "Down with MacDonald the Traitor" in the rigging and sailed round the British Isles in her.

After the death of Lady Houston in 1936, Liberty was sold to John Cashmore Ltd for scrap and towed to Newport, Monmouthshire to be dismantled in January 1938.

References

External links
HMHS Liberty

Steam yachts
Ships built in Leith
Hospital ships in World War I
1907 ships
Former yachts of New York City